Thomas Hesketh (1548–1605), of Whitehill  and Preston, Lancashire and of Heslington, Yorkshire, was an English politician.

He was a Member (MP) of the Parliament of England for Preston in 1586 and 1589, Lancaster in 1597 and 1604, and Lancashire in 1601.

References

1548 births
1605 deaths
Members of the Parliament of England (pre-1707) for Lancashire
Politicians from Preston, Lancashire
Politicians from York
English MPs 1586–1587
English MPs 1589
English MPs 1604–1611
English MPs 1601